Gwiazda may refer to:

Andrzej Gwiazda (born 1935), in Gdańsk engineer and prominent opposition leader
Gwiazda Lake, ribbon lake situated in Pomeranian Voivodeship in Bytów County
Gwiazda Polski, balloon designed by the Polish planners to reach the stratosphere
Henry Gwiazda (born 1952), composer who specializes in virtual audio (simulation of a 3D sound space)
Joanna Duda-Gwiazda (born 1939), wife of Andrzej Gwiazda, Polish politician
Gwiazda (Holyoke) (1923–1956), Holyoke, Massachusetts newspaper published in Polish
Gwiazda (Philadelphia) (1902–1985), Philadelphia newspaper published in Polish